Once is the fifth studio album by Finnish symphonic metal band Nightwish, released on 7 June 2004 by Spinefarm Records in Finland and Nuclear Blast in the rest of Europe. It is the fifth and last album to feature Tarja Turunen on lead vocals. The album cost nearly €250,000 to make, (1,000,000 including the videos) which made it Finland's most expensive recording ever until the release of Nightwish's next album, Dark Passion Play, which cost over €500,000 to produce. As of 2013, Once had sold 2.3 million copies worldwide, becoming Nightwish's most successful album to date. The remastering of the album was released on 6 August 2021.

Background
In a 2008 Kerrang! interview, Tuomas Holopainen remembered: "Doing this kind of really orchestral, symphonic stuff for four albums, you have to be prepared to take the next step and go 10 steps beyond, and that's how we ended up with the London Session Orchestra. At that time we also had the financial resources to do it. This was like our second breakthrough in a way; Oceanborn (1998) broke us, took us to the big league. Musically it was pretty laid-back from our side because everyone involved in the orchestra really knew their stuff, so we basically spent two days lying on the couch hearing all these people playing our songs, enjoying every moment. It was one of the most amazing experiences in my life. The first song they started to play was "Ghost Love Score", we had no idea what to expect, and I just thought: This can't be happening!"

Musical style

The album continues the more streamlined musical approach first heard on Century Child, moving further away from the power metal-influenced sound of their previous albums into symphonic metal with a slightly more mainstream, approachable feel. Once utilizes a full orchestra in nine of the eleven songs on the album; unlike Century Child, Nightwish chose an orchestra outside of Finland, the London Philharmonic Orchestra, which has been featured on every album released since.

Once is their second album to feature a full-length song in Finnish, "Kuolema Tekee Taiteilijan". The band added new elements to their music for this album, such as the chorus riff and synthesized drum-beat of "Wish I Had an Angel", and a long prayer chant on "Creek Mary's Blood". The song "Ghost Love Score" was described by Hietala as follows: "I'm a big fan of old prog rock and this is a song that has a lot of different parts going on, and different atmospheres in different places in order to support the story. [...] My biggest influence from the prog world would be Jethro Tull, but I also love listening to Yes and Genesis and all those bands, and there's a correlation between the structures and the length of a lot of their songs and this one."

Artwork
The angel on the album cover is a view of the Angel of Grief, a sculpture by William Wetmore Story. The original is in the Protestant Cemetery of Rome, Italy.

Tour

The success of the album allowed them to perform the Once Upon a Tour, which enabled them to play in many countries the band had never visited before. Nightwish performed at the opening ceremony of the 2005 World Championships in Athletics, held in Helsinki.

Reception and legacy

During the first week of its release, Once entered the Finnish, German and Norwegian charts at number one, later topping the European Top 100 Albums chart. It was also the first Nightwish album to chart in the United States, reaching No. 42 on the Billboard Top Heatseekers chart, and the band's first album to chart in UK, reaching  10 on the Rock Chart. In 2005, Once was ranked number 383 in Rock Hard magazine's book The 500 Greatest Rock & Metal Albums of All Time. In 2017, it was ranked 89th at Rolling Stone's "100 Greatest Metal Albums of All Time".

Once has been certified double platinum in Finland, platinum in Germany, gold in Sweden The single "Nemo" topped the charts in Finland and Hungary, and reached the top ten in four additional countries. It remained on the UK Rock Chart for more than a year. "Nemo" therefore remains their most successful single ever, and Once reached number 47 in the list of best-selling albums of all time in Finland. As of June 2013, the album had sold 2.3 million copies worldwide, Nightwish's best-selling album to date.

Track listing

Personnel
All information from the album booklet.

 

Nightwish
 Tarja Turunen – vocals
 Tuomas Holopainen – keyboards
 Emppu Vuorinen – guitars
 Marko Hietala – bass, male vocals on tracks 2, 4, 6, 8, and 11
 Jukka Nevalainen – drums, percussion

Additional musicians
 Marc Brueland – narration on "Higher Than Hope"
 Jouni Hynynen – growling on "Dead Gardens"
 Sami Yli-Sirniö – sitar on "The Siren"
 John Two-Hawks – vocals and Native American flute on "Creek Mary's Blood"
 Olli Halonen – slide guitars
 Martin Loveday – cello on "The Siren"
 Sonia Slaney – violin on "The Siren"
 London Philharmonic Orchestra – orchestral parts
 Jenny O'Grady – choirmaster
 Metro Voices – choir
 James Shearman – orchestra and choir conductor
 Gavyn Wright – orchestra leader

Production
 Tuomas Holopainen – producer, mixing
 Emppu Vuorinen – additional engineering
 Tero "TeeCee" Kinnunen – producer, engineer, mixing
 Mikko Karmila – engineer, mixing
 Mika Jussila – mastering
 Pip Williams – choir and orchestral arrangements
 James Collins – orchestral recordings engineer
 Aaron Price – assistant engineer
 Simon Goldfinch – assistant engineer
 Markus Mayer – cover art
 Toni Härkönen – photography
 Petteri Tyynelä – layout

Charts

Weekly charts

Year-end charts

Certifications and sales

Release history

References

Bibliography

2004 albums
Finnish-language albums
Nightwish albums
Nuclear Blast albums
Roadrunner Records albums
Spinefarm Records albums